NTH or Nth may refer to:

 th, position  in a sequence for an arbitrary natural number 
 Nth (trigraph)
 Neath railway station, Neath Port Talbot, Wales, National Rail station code
 North
 Northamptonshire, county in England, Chapman code
 Northumberland, England
 Norwegian Institute of Technology
 Hokkaido Air System (ICAO: HAC), a Japanese airline

See also
 Nth Man
 The Nth Degree (disambiguation)

 Anth (disambiguation)